Vincent James Hogan (7 November 1920 – 11 February 2001) was an Australian rules footballer who played with North Melbourne and St Kilda in the Victorian Football League (VFL).

Notes

External links 

1920 births
2001 deaths
Australian rules footballers from Melbourne
North Melbourne Football Club players
St Kilda Football Club players
People from Kensington, Victoria